Xin may refer to:

Xin Dynasty, which ruled China from 8–23 AD
Xincan languages (ISO 639: xin), a small extinct family of Mesoamerican languages

People
Xin (surname), Chinese surname
Empress Xin (Zhang Zuo's wife) (died ), wife of the Chinese state Former Liang's ruler Zhang Zuo
Noble Consort Xin (1737–1764), consort of the Qianlong Emperor

Philosophy
 Xin (heart-mind), 心
 Xin (virtue), 信, one of the Three Fundamental Bonds and Five Constant Virtues

Places
Xinjiang Uyghur Autonomous Region, abbreviated as Xin, the northwestern region of China
Xin County, Xinyang, Henan, China
Xin River, a tributary to Poyang Lake in Jiangxi Province

Popular culture
Xin (comics), a comic book by Kevin Lau, or its main character
Xin, the "Ember Spirit", a character in Defense of the Ancients and Dota 2
"Xin", an episode of The Good Doctor

See also

 Shin (disambiguation)
 Xing (disambiguation)

nl:Xin